Eve Cornwell is a British YouTuber and former lawyer. She has been described as both a StudyTuber and LawTuber.

Career 
Cornwell began her eponymous YouTube channel in 2013. On her channel, she documented her time studying law at Bristol University. In 2019, Cornwell launched the Millenial Coffee Club. Millenial Coffee Club launched their own blend of coffee in 2020.

After graduating, Cornwell shifted her content towards capturing her career in law. She also moved away from YouTube and made more short form content on TikTok and Instagram Reels. This lead The Times to describe her, among others, as a "lawfluencer." She began working at Linklaters as a trainee in 2019, but left her legal practice position in 2022 to work in legal tech at CreateiQ. 

Cornwell is managed by Sixteenth.

References 

Alumni of the University of Bristol
English YouTubers
English video bloggers
Educational and science YouTubers
21st-century women lawyers
Lawyers from London
21st-century English lawyers
English women lawyers
1990s births
Living people